Znak can refer to:
 Znak (association)
 Znak (publisher)
 Znak Ltd.
 Two letters (signs) in the Russian alphabet, Hard sign and Soft sign
 , a former Russian news site
 "Znak", a song by Ewa Farna

Znak is the name of:
 Marina Znak (*1961), Belarusian rower
 Maxim Znak, Belarusian activist and lawyer, member of the Coordination Council (Belarus)